Route 455 is a  long mostly West–East secondary highway in the northwest portion of New Brunswick, Canada.

The route's western terminus starts west of Allainville at a 90 degree turn on Route 450.  The road travels east through the community of Allainville then Lauvergot before briefly merging with Route 445 in Fairisle south to Caissie Road.  From there the road again continues south east entering the community of Neguac at Route 11.

History

See also

References

455
455